Justice Bheki Maphalala is the Chief Justice of the Kingdom of Eswatini. He was formally appointed to the position  10 November 2015, having been the Acting Chief Justice after the previous officeholder, Michael Ramodibedi, had been dismissed by King Mswati III for serious misbehaviour in June 2015.

References

Living people
Chief justices of Eswatini
Year of birth missing (living people)
Swazi judges
Place of birth missing (living people)